The East Geelong Football Club, nicknamed the Eagles, is an Australian rules football and netball club based in the Geelong suburb of East Geelong. The club teams currently compete in the Geelong & District Football League.

Since the club's formation in 1879, the club has been known as East Geelong (1879-1892, 1907-1979, 2000-present), Marylebone (1893-1906), and Eastern Suburbs (1980-1999).

In 1979, East Geelong were a founding club of the Geelong Football League, only to return to the Geelong & District Football League the following year.

Premierships 

Reference:

References

External links

 Facebook page
 SportsTG website

Geelong Football League clubs
Sports clubs established in 1879
Australian rules football clubs established in 1879
1879 establishments in Australia
Geelong & District Football League clubs
Netball teams in Geelong
Australian rules football clubs in Geelong